Manticora latipennis is a species of tiger beetle native to South Africa, Transvaal, Bechuanaland, Ngami and Damaraland in Africa.

Taxonomy
This species was the second to be described in the genus Manticora and was based on a single female specimen from Kurrichane, South Africa.

Description
The head, thorax and abdomen of both adult males and females are black, occasionally reddish brown, and very glossy. The legs and tarsi are black.

Feeding Habits
Manticora latipennis is a highly voracious predator, preying on small arthropods such as crickets. The larvae patiently wait for prey to come towards them while the adults actively pursue prey.

References

External links
 Manticora latipennis in Annales de la Société Entomologique de France

Cicindelidae
Beetles described in 1837